Fabritius de Tengnagel is a Danish and Norwegian noble family.

History
The family originated from Johannes Fabritius (1620–71) of Brandenburg. The genus immigrated to Denmark with his son Herman Fabritius (1667-1729). Conrad Alexander Fabritius (1731–1805) and Michael Fabritius (1739–1815), as well as all legitimate children of their then-deceased father Michael Fabritius (1697-1746), were on 4 September 1778 ennobled by letters patent under the name Fabritius de Tengnagel.

Notable family members
 Frederik Michael Ernst Fabritius de Tengnagel (1781–1849), landscape painter
 Conrad Fabritius de Tengnagel
 Signe Frigg Fabritius de Tengnagel Tscherning Jønsson
 Ronja Frigg Fabritius de Tengnagel Tscherning Jønsson
 Felix Frigg Fabritius de Tengnagel Tscherning Jønsson
 Amy Jeyasri Frigg Fabritius de Tengnagel Tscherning Jønsson Larsen

See also
 Danish nobility
 Norwegian nobility

References

Literature
 Dansk Adelskalender (1878): Fabritius de Tengnagel at skislekt.no/adel.
 A. Thiset og P.L. Wittrup: Nyt dansk Adelslexikon, Copenhagen 1904 
 Sven Tito Achen: Danske adelsvåbener, Copenhagen 1973

Danish noble families
Norwegian noble families
1778 establishments in Denmark